Bernd Tauber (born 7 May 1950, Göppingen, West Germany) is a German actor. He is best known for his role as Navigator Kriechbaum in the 1981 film Das Boot.

In the mid-1980s, Tauber appeared on the TV show Lindenstraße as Benno Zimmermann, the first HIV-positive character in German television.

Filmography
  (1976) - Werner Wild
  (1977) - Thomas Berger
  (1979, TV miniseries) - Emil Granowski
  (1980) - Robert Lueg
 Auf Achse: Tommy's Trip (1980, TV series episode) - Tommy
 Das Boot (1981) - Kriechbaum - Chief Quartermaster-Navigator
 Reifenwechsel (1983, TV film) - Steve
 Lindenstraße (1985–1988, TV series, 85 episodes) - Benno Zimmermann
 Retouche (1987) - Wolf Rotter
  (1989) - Kommissar Egli
 Amaurose (1991)
 Gudrun (1992) - Albert
 Das merkwürdige Verhalten geschlechtsreifer Großstädter zur Paarungszeit (1998) - Kurt
  (1999) - Worzig
 The State I Am In (2000) - Achim
 Gott ist tot (2003) - Walter
 Der Puppengräber (2003) - Jakob Schlösser
 Blackout Journey (2004)
 Vinzent (2004) - Dr. Bernhard
 Fremde Haut (2005) - Beamter BAFL
 Die zwei Leben des Daniel Shore (2009) - Prof. Hübner
 Die Unbedingten (2009) - Heinrich Feister
  (2009) - Bürgermeister
 Trash Detective (2015) - Rudi Nussbaum

References

External links
 

Living people
1950 births
People from Göppingen
German male film actors
German male television actors
20th-century German male actors
21st-century German male actors
German Film Award winners